Coming Up for Air is the second studio album by Irish rock band Kodaline. It was released on 9 February 2015 by Sony Music Entertainment.

Critical reception

Coming Up For Air received generally mixed reviews from critics: it has a score of 51 out of 100 on Metacritic, based on 7 reviews, which indicates "mixed or average reviews".

Singles
"Honest" was released as the first single from the album on 8 December 2014. The song peaked at number 7 in Ireland and number 39 in the United Kingdom. "The One" was released as the second single from the album on 6 February 2015. The song peaked at number 29 in Ireland and number 27 in the United Kingdom. "Ready" was released as the third single from the album on 15 May 2015.

Track listing

Charts

Weekly charts

Year-end charts

Certifications

Release history

References

Kodaline albums
B-Unique Records albums
2015 albums